Emily Townsend Menges (born July 28, 1992) is an American professional soccer player who plays as a defender in the National Women's Soccer League (NWSL) for Portland Thorns FC, with whom she won the 2016 and 2021 NWSL Shield and also the 2017 and 2022 NWSL Championships. She also plays for Melbourne Victory in the Australian W-League. She previously played for the Long Island Fury in the second-division Women's Premier Soccer League, with whom she won the 2009 national championship.

Early life
Menges was born in Garden City, New York and attended Garden City High School. She played for the Albertson Fury '91, winning three consecutive Eastern New York Youth Soccer Association (ENYYSA) State Open Cups from 2009 to 2011.

Georgetown
Menges attended Georgetown University. She finished her college career as one of the most decorated players in program history, earning the Big East Defensive Player of the Year award and NSCAA First Team All-American honors in 2013, in addition to being a three-time All-Big East selection. She captained the Hoyas' defense to 23 shutouts over her final two seasons, including a school-record 13 clean sheets as a junior in 2012. Menges appeared in 84 games (83 starts), scored two goals, and helped the Georgetown defense post 40 shutouts. She was a MAC Hermann Trophy semi-finalist in 2012 and 2013.

Playing career

Club

Long Island Fury
Menges played for the Long Island Fury, winning the second-division Women's Premier Soccer League (WPSL) national championship in 2009.

Portland Thorns FC, 2014–
Portland Thorns FC selected Menges with the 25th overall pick in the third round of the 2014 NWSL College Draft. She made her first appearance with the Thorns on April 12, 2014, helping the team record a shutout in a 1–0 road win against the Houston Dash.

Menges was a starting centerback for the Thorns when they won the 2016 NWSL Shield and the 2017 NWSL Championship. She has been a favorite of fans, winning the Supporters' Player of the Year award in 2016.

International
In December 2013, Menges was called up to participate in training camp with the U.S. Under-23 Women's National Team. In November 2016, Menges was called into training camp with the U.S. women's national soccer team.

Awards

Team
Portland Thorns FC

 International Champions Cup: 2021
 NWSL Championship: 2017, 2022
 NWSL Shield: 2016

Long Island Fury

 WPSL national championship: 2009

Personal

Professional 
NWSL Best XI – 2016

NWSL Second XI – 2017

Team Most Valuable Player (Portland Thorns) – 2016

Supporters' Player of the Year (Portland Thorns) – 2016

College 
First Team All-American (NCSAA) – 2013

MAC Hermann Trophy semi-finalist – 2012, 2013

Big East Defensive Player of the Year – 2013

Personal life
Menges is the vice-president of the I'm Not Done Yet Foundation, an organization started by the Menges family after her brother Bobby's death in 2017. I'm Not Done Yet is dedicated to helping pediatric and young adult patients with cancer and other chronic illnesses.

References

External links

 Georgetown player profile
 Portland Thorns FC player profile
 

1992 births
Living people
American women's soccer players
Georgetown Hoyas women's soccer players
National Women's Soccer League players
People from Garden City, New York
Portland Thorns FC draft picks
Portland Thorns FC players
Soccer players from New York (state)
Sportspeople from Nassau County, New York
Women's association football defenders
Garden City High School (New York) alumni